"All Night" is a song recorded by South Korean girl group Girls' Generation for their sixth studio album Holiday Night (2017). The song was released digitally on August 4, 2017, as the album's single alongside "Holiday" by S.M. Entertainment.

Composition 
According to Billboards Tamar Herman, "All Night" is a nu-disco tune in the style of a bubblegum pop song that features a 1980s vibe with "thumping" bass and "twinky electronic" melody. Jacques Peterson from Idolator described the track as "funky nu-disco" that turns "a teenage slumber party into Studio 54." Lyrically, the song is a dedication to Girls' Generation's longevity and bond with their supporters which, according to Herman, is "atypical" for K-pop girl groups.

Chart performance 
"All Night" debuted at number 35 on the Gaon Digital Chart, on the chart issue dated July 30 – August 5, 2017, with 47,802 downloads sold.

Music videos 
A documentary-style music video for the song was released on August 4, 2017, featuring in between mini-interviews of the eight members reflecting upon their career, interspersed with scenes of the girls having fun and dancing in a disco club. The video ends with clips from the early days of the group, which offers up "a quick trip down memory lane of what is now one of K-pop's most legendary acts", according to Billboard'''s Tamar Herman. A "clean version" music video excluding mini-interviews was released the following day and features only the disco scenes.

 Reception 
Idolator's Jacques Peterson wrote, "Even if you don't listen to K-Pop, these tracks ["All Night" and "Holiday"] are absolute must-haves for any pop playlist this summer."

The song made Billboard's "20 Best K-pop Songs of 2017" list at number 14, described as a slick single appropriate for vogue-off as it is for a K-pop concert.

Charts

 Credits 
Credits are adapted from Holiday Night'' liner notes.

Studio 
 SM Blue Ocean Studio – recording
 Ingrid Studio – recording
 SM Concert Hall Studio – mixing
 SM Big Shot Studio – digital editing
 Sterling Sound – mastering

Personnel 

 SM Entertainment – executive producer
 Lee Soo-man – producer
 Kim Young-min – executive supervisor
 Yoo Young-jin – music and sound supervisor
 Girls' Generation – vocals, background vocals
 Kenzie – lyrics, vocal directing
 Hayley Aitken – composition, background vocals
 Ollipop – composition, arrangement
 Daniel Caesar – composition, arrangement
 Ludwig Lindell – composition, arrangement
 Kim Cheol-sun – recording
 Jung Eun-kyung – recording
 Choo Dae-kwan – recording assistant
 Lee Min-gyu – digital editing
 Nam Koong-jin – mixing
 Randy Merrill – mastering

References 

Girls' Generation songs
2017 singles
2017 songs
SM Entertainment singles
Nu-disco songs
Songs written by Kenzie (songwriter)
Songs written by Hayley Aitken